Bleesbruck is a village in the commune of Bettendorf, in eastern Luxembourg.  Located nearby is the confluence of the Sauer and the Blees.

Bettendorf, Luxembourg
Villages in Luxembourg